Amada enemiga (English: Beloved Enemy) is a Mexican telenovela produced by Carlos Sotomayor for Televisa in 1997. This telenovela based on radionovela Cuando la rival es una hija by Inés Rodena.

On Monday, August 18, 1997, Canal de las Estrellas started broadcasting Amada enemiga weekdays at 7:00pm, replacing Gente bien. The last episode was broadcast on Friday, December 5, 1997 with Mi pequeña traviesa replacing it the following day.

Dominika Paleta, Susana Dosamantes and Enrique Ibáñez starred as protagonists, while the leading actor Guillermo Murray starred as main antagonist.

Synopsis 
Regina (Susana Dosamantes) is married to a much older man (Guillermo Murray). She leads a sedate life but longs for some passion. On a business trip to Miami, Regina meets Samuel (Enrique Ibañez), a much younger man, and they have a brief but torrid affair. On her return, Regina finds to her horror that Samuel is now working for her husband. To make matters worse, her daughter Jessica (Dominika Paleta) falls for her father's new employee. To save Regina's reputation, Samuel agrees to marry Jessica.

Cast 
Dominika Paleta as Jessica Quijano Proal
Susana Dosamantes as Regina Proal de Quijano
Enrique Ibáñez as Alonso Velarde
Guillermo Murray as Esteban Quijano
Cecilia Gabriela as Cecilia Sandoval
Hugo Acosta as Héctor
Eduardo Noriega as Arcadio Lubo
María Rubio as Reinalda Proal
Roberto Palazuelos as Mauricio Martinez
Luis Miguel as Mauricio
Mauricio Aspe as Jorge Pruneda
Rocío Sobrado as Rebeca Sandoval
Teo Tapia as Alejandro
Lucero Lander as Alicia Benitez
Kenia Gazcón as Gilda Moreno
Mariet Rodríguez as Alexandra Pruneda
Israel Jaitovich as Francisco
Vanessa Villela as Sara
Carmen Amezcua as Elena Moreno
Amara Villafuerte as Felisa
Fabián Robles as Marcos Benitez
Zully Keith as Rita de Pruneda
Irlanda Mora as Fernanda
Israel Jaitovich as Francisco
Marco Uriel as Emiliano
Martha Zamora as Malena
Carlos Bracho as Abelardo
Gustavo Negrete

References

External links

1997 telenovelas
Mexican telenovelas
1997 Mexican television series debuts
1997 Mexican television series endings
Spanish-language telenovelas
Television shows set in Mexico City
Televisa telenovelas